Bete Grise is an unincorporated community in Grant Township, Keweenaw County, Michigan. The community lies on the shore of Lake Superior. The community is located on the north side of Bete Grise Bay. The Mendota Canal cuts the bay in half, which allows travel from Lac La Belle to Lake Superior. Most of the beach is public land, with the Bete Grise Nature Preserve occupying the land south of the canal.

The Mendota Light is south of the community, which provided navigation aid to the canal.

References

Unincorporated communities in Keweenaw County, Michigan
Unincorporated communities in Michigan
Michigan populated places on Lake Superior